Luis José Espinal Florencio (born 20 February 1994) is a Dominican footballer who plays as a forward for Atlético Pantoja and the Dominican Republic national team.

International career
Espinal made his formal debut for Dominican Republic on 22 March 2018, being a second half substitute in a 4–0 friendly win against Turks and Caicos Islands. He had faced Puerto Rico, Martinique and Nicaragua (twice) between 2016 and 2017, but none of these matches were recognised by FIFA.

International goals
Scores and results list Dominican Republic's goal tally first

Honors and awards

Clubs
Deportivo Pantoja
Primera División de Republica Dominicana: 2011–12

Atlético Pantoja
Liga Dominicana de Fútbol: 2015
Caribbean Club Championship: 2018

References

External links

1994 births
Living people
Dominican Republic footballers
Association football forwards
Liga Dominicana de Fútbol players
Dominican Republic international footballers
Dominican Republic under-20 international footballers